Hemel may refer to:

Places
Hemel Hempstead

Sport
Hemel Hempstead Town F.C., an association football club
 Hemel Stags, a rugby league club

Science
Trade name for altretamine

Popular culture
Hemel (film), a 2012 Dutch film

People 
Armijn Hemel
Mark Hemel (born 1966), Dutch architect and designer

Surnames of Dutch origin
Bengali-language surnames
Surnames of Bengali origin